John Struthers may refer to:

John Struthers (anatomist) (1823–1899), Professor of Anatomy at the University of Aberdeen, Scotland
John Struthers (poet) (1776–1853), Scottish poet and writer
J. P. Struthers (1851–1915), Scottish preacher, pastor and children's author